Agricultural Experiment Stations Act of 1887 is a United States federal statute establishing agricultural research by the governance of the United States land-grant colleges as enacted by the Land-Grant Agricultural and Mechanical College Act of 1862. The agricultural experiment station alliance was granted fiscal appropriations by the enactment of the Hatch Act of 1887. The Act of Congress defines the basis of the agricultural experiments and scientific research by the State or Territory educational institutions.

Scope of Agricultural Research
 Physiology of plants and animals
 Diseases to which they are exposed to include antidotes for determined diseases
 Chemical composition of useful plants at their different stages of growth
 Comparative advantages of rotative cropping as pursued under a varying series of crops
 Capacity of new plants or trees for acclimation
 Analysis of soils and water
 Chemical composition of manures, natural, or artificial, with experiments designed to test their comparative effects on crops of different kinds
 Adaptation and value of grasses and forage plants
 Composition and digestibility of the different kinds of food for domestic animals
 Scientific and economic questions involved in the production of butter and cheese
 Other researches or experiments bearing directly on the agricultural industry of the United States as may in each case be deemed advisable, having due regard to the varying conditions and needs of the respective States or Territories

Concession of Agricultural Experiment Stations
December 4, 1893: First Annual Message to the Congress of the United States 

- Grover Cleveland, 22nd and 24th President of the United States

Related U.S. Statutes of 1887 Act
Chronological legislation relative to U.S. Congressional provisions as regarding the Agricultural Experiment Stations Act.

See also
Agricultural Experiment Station Barn
Bureau of Animal Industry
Farmers' Bulletin
Henry Leavitt Ellsworth
History of agriculture in the United States
List of land-grant universities
Mechanised agriculture
Smith–Lever Act of 1914
United States Department of Agriculture

References

External links
 
 
 
 
 
 
 

49th United States Congress
United States federal agriculture legislation